The 1986 Eckerd Open was a women's tennis tournament played on outdoor hard courts at the Bardmoor Country Club in Largo, Florida in the United States and was part of the 1986 Virginia Slims World Championship Series. It was the 14th edition of the tournament and was held from September 15 through September 21, 1986. Unseeded Lori McNeil won the singles title and earned $25,000 first-prize money.

Finals

Singles
 Lori McNeil defeated  Zina Garrison 2–6, 7–5, 6–2
 It was McNeil's 1st singles title of her career.

Doubles
 Elise Burgin /  Rosalyn Fairbank defeated  Gigi Fernández /  Kim Sands 7–5, 6–2

References

External links
 ITF tournament edition details
 Tournament draws

Eckerd Open
Eckerd Open
Eckerd Open
20th century in Tampa, Florida
Sports competitions in Tampa, Florida
Eckerd Open
Eckerd Open